Christian Friedrich "Fritz" Göttisheim (28 March 1837 – 12 July 1896) was a Swiss politician and President of the Swiss Council of States (1891/1892).

External links 
 
 

1837 births
1896 deaths
Members of the Council of States (Switzerland)
Presidents of the Council of States (Switzerland)